Events in the year 1985 in Mexico.

Incumbents

Federal government 
 President: Miguel de la Madrid
 Interior Secretary (SEGOB): Manuel Bartlett Díaz
 Secretary of Foreign Affairs (SRE): Bernardo Sepúlveda Amor
 Communications Secretary (SCT): Daniel Díaz Díaz
 Education Secretary (SEP): Manuel Bartlett
 Secretary of Defense (SEDENA): Juan Arévalo Gardoqui
 Secretary of Navy: Miguel Ángel Gómez Ortega
 Secretary of Labor and Social Welfare: Arsenio Farell Cubillas
 Secretary of Welfare: Guillermo Carrillo Arena
 Secretary of Public Education: Jesús Reyes Heroles/Miguel González Avelar
 Tourism Secretary (SECTUR): Carlos Hank González 
 Secretary of the Environment (SEMARNAT): Pedro Ojeda Paullada
 Secretary of Health (SALUD): Guillermo Soberón Acevedo

Supreme Court

 President of the Supreme Court: Jorge Iñárritu y Ramírez de Aguilar

Governors 

 Aguascalientes: Rodolfo Landeros Gallegos
 Baja California: Xicoténcatl Leyva Mortera (PRI) 
 Baja California Sur: Alberto Andrés Alvarado Arámburo
 Campeche: Eugenio Echeverría Castellot/Abelardo Carrillo Zavala
 Chiapas: Absalón Castellanos Domínguez
 Chihuahua: Oscar Ornelas/Saúl González Herrera
 Coahuila: José de las Fuentes Rodríguez
 Colima: Elías Zamora Verduzco
 Durango: Armando del Castillo Franco/José Ramírez Gamero 
 Guanajuato: Agustin Téllez Cruces/Rafael Corrales Ayala
 Guerrero: Alejandro Cervantes Delgado
 Hidalgo: Guillermo Rossell de la Lama
 Jalisco: Enrique Álvarez del Castillo
 State of Mexico: Alfredo del Mazo González
 Michoacán: Cuauhtémoc Cárdenas
 Morelos: Lauro Ortega Martínez (PRI).
 Nayarit: Emilio Manuel González Parra
 Nuevo León: Alfonso Martínez Domínguez/Jorge Treviño
 Oaxaca: Heladio Ramírez López
 Puebla: Guillermo Jiménez Morales
 Querétaro: Mariano Palacios Alcocer
 Quintana Roo: Pedro Joaquín Coldwell
 San Luis Potosí: Florencio Salazar Martínez
 Sinaloa: Francisco Labastida
 Sonora: Rodolfo Félix Valdés 
 Tabasco: Enrique González Pedrero
 Tamaulipas: Américo Villarreal Guerra	
 Tlaxcala: Tulio Hernández Gómez
 Veracruz: Agustín Acosta Lagunes
 Yucatán: Víctor Manzanilla Schaffer
 Zacatecas: José Guadalupe Cervantes Corona
Regent of Mexico City: Ramón Aguirre Velázquez

Events

 January 1, Querétaro state elections
 June 17, Morelos I was the first communications satellite launch by Mexico.
 July 7, state elections in Colima
 September 19,  a magnitude 8.0 earthquake struck in Mexico City.
 The LIII Legislature Congress of Mexico begins its inauguration.
 November 26, on the STS-61-B mission Rodolfo Neri Vela became the first Mexican and second Latin American astronaut to reach into space.

Awards
Belisario Domínguez Medal of Honor – María Lavalle Urbina

Notable births
September 19 – Fourteen newborn babies survived the earthquake.
October 6 – Sandra Góngora, ten-pin bowler
October 15 – Sherlyn González, singer and actress.
December 11 – Karla Souza, Mexican-American actress.
Date unknown – Ricardo Domínguez, welterweight wrestler (d. 2017).

Notable deaths
An estimated 10,000 people died during the September 19 earthquake.

Sports
 Mexico managed to win for the first time to Poland on 5 February when at the opening of Corregidora Stadium in Querétaro.

References

 
Years of the 20th century in Mexico
Mexico